Mahone's Tavern, also known as Kello's Tavern, Vaughn's Tavern and Howard's Hotel, is a historic inn and tavern located in Courtland, Southampton County, Virginia. It was built about 1796, and is a two-story, three-bay, gable-roofed, wood-framed structure with exterior gable end chimneys.  A rebuilt hyphen and kitchen structure were added in 1933. In 1831, like nearly every standing building in Courtland, or Jerusalem at the time, it became a refuge and gathering place for local citizens during the slave uprising led by Nat Turner, known as Nat Turner's slave rebellion.  The building was also the boyhood home of two persons who later achieved national prominence: Confederate General William Mahone and John J. Kindred, resident from 1859 to 1869, who later became a U.S. Senator from New York. It ceased being used as a tavern or hotel in 1901.

It was listed on the National Register of Historic Places in 2006.

See also
National Register of Historic Places listings in Southampton County, Virginia

References

External links
 

Drinking establishments on the National Register of Historic Places in Virginia
Commercial buildings completed in 1831
Buildings and structures in Southampton County, Virginia
National Register of Historic Places in Southampton County, Virginia